The  Harry S Truman Reservoir, also known as Truman Lake, is located in the state of Missouri, United States. It is located between Clinton and Warsaw, on the Osage River and extends south to Osceola. The dam is located in Benton County, but the reservoir also extends into parts of Henry, St. Clair, and Hickory counties.

History
The U.S. Army Corps of Engineers built and manages the lake and dam.  It is used primarily for flood control. It is also used for power generation, recreation, and wildlife management.

Originally named Kaysinger Bluff Dam and Reservoir in 1954, when construction was authorized, construction began in August 1964. It was renamed the Harry S Truman Dam and Reservoir, in honor of the former president from Missouri, by Congress in 1970. Construction was completed in 1979.  The Kaysinger name refers to the bluff immediately north next to where the dam was eventually constructed.  The bluff or cliff, a popular landmark even before the dam, overlooked the confluence of the South Grand River, Tebo Creek and the Osage River.  The visitor center now sits on the bluff.

Completing the Truman Project took many years of planning, land acquisition, constructing new bridges and demolishing old ones. Several roads, towns, and cemeteries had to be relocated. The first construction project completed on the project was relocating Route 13 so it would be above maximum pool level.

The creation of the lake forced the closure of the Frisco Railroad's "Highline". Rising water levels severed the railroad tracks near Osceola and Deepwater and railroad officials declined to spend millions of dollars to reroute the lightly used tracks. The Missouri-Kansas-Texas Railroad, however, did relocate its main line between La Due and Clinton; the project included five miles of new track and a causeway/bridge combination over the lake.

Harry S Truman Regional Visitor Center
The Harry S Truman Regional Visitor Center contains exhibits about the cultural and natural history of Truman Lake, environmental activities, the construction of the dam, the operation of the powerhouse, and the US Army Corps of Engineers.  A 67-seat theater shows wildlife, history and water safety videos by request.  The observation deck offers views of Truman Lake and part of the Lake of the Ozarks, as well as the dam.

Harry S Truman State Park

Harry S Truman State Park is located in Benton County, Missouri on a peninsula that juts out into the reservoir.

Weaubleau-Osceola structure
The south-west portion of the lake makes up part of the circumference of the Weaubleau-Osceola structure, a 330-335 million year old impact crater.

Harry S Truman Dam

References

External links  
Harry S. Truman Regional Visitor Center
 Harry S. Truman State Park
 Page at ShowMeLakes.com

Reservoirs in Missouri
Dams in Missouri
Lakes of the U.S. Interior Highlands
Bodies of water of the Ozarks
Museums in Benton County, Missouri
Natural history museums in Missouri
Industry museums in Missouri
Protected areas of Henry County, Missouri
Protected areas of Hickory County, Missouri
Protected areas of St. Clair County, Missouri
Buildings and structures in Henry County, Missouri
Buildings and structures in Hickory County, Missouri
Buildings and structures in St. Clair County, Missouri
Protected areas of Benton County, Missouri
United States Army Corps of Engineers dams
Dams completed in 1979
Bodies of water of Henry County, Missouri
Bodies of water of Hickory County, Missouri
Bodies of water of St. Clair County, Missouri
Bodies of water of Benton County, Missouri
1979 establishments in Missouri